The Nam Theun 2 Power Company Limited (NTPC) is a company set up to build and operate the Nam Theun 2 Multi-Purpose Project in Khammouane Province in Laos.

Ownership
It is owned by a consortium comprising:
 Electricité de France International (EDFI) of France (40%), a wholly owned subsidiary of the state-owned French power company Electricité de France (EDF);
 Electricity Generating Public Company (EGCO) of Thailand (35%), a leading owner and operator of independent power plants in Thailand that itself is owned by the state-owned Thai power company EGAT (25.4%) and the Hong Kong-based privately owned international CLP Group (22.4%);
 Government of Laos (25%), represented by Lao Holding State Enterprise (LHSE).

Governments and government-owned enterprises own a majority of NTPC. This situation is atypical for an Independent Power Project (IPP) where normally the power generating company is privately owned.

References

Electric power companies of Laos
Hydropower
Électricité de France